The Union State Bank, headquartered in Pell City, Alabama, United States, was established in 1903. In 2010, the bank had 15 offices in Alabama and Florida.

References

Banks based in Alabama